The men's K-1 500 metres event was an individual kayaking event conducted as part of the Canoeing at the 1980 Summer Olympics program.

Medalists

Results

Heats
The 21 competitors first raced in three heats on July 30. The top three finishers from each of the heats advanced directly to the semifinals. Four competitors did not start. The rest competed in the repechages.

Repechages
Taking place on July 30, the top three finishers from each repechage advanced to the semifinals.

Semifinals
The top three finishers in each of the three semifinals (raced on August 1) advanced to the final.

Final
The final was held on August 1.

References
1980 Summer Olympics official report Volume 3. p. 183. 
Sports-reference.com 1980 men's K-1 500 m results

Men's K-1 500
Men's events at the 1980 Summer Olympics